Cilix glaucata, the Chinese character, is a moth of the family Drepanidae. It was first described by the Italian physician and naturalist, Giovanni Antonio Scopoli in his 1763 Entomologia Carniolica. It is found in Europe, Asia Minor and North Africa.

Description
The wingspan is 18–22 mm. The moth flies from April to August depending on the location. Cilix glaucata lives on sunny and warm forest edges, slopes and hedges, on bushy dry grasslands and heaths, but also in parks.

The moth has porcelain-white wings, with a series of small grey spots along the outside edge of the front wing and the inner edge has a large dark brown stain, which turns yellow and grey towards the middle of the wing. Occasionally there are silvery scales. The wingtips are rounded and not curved. If they are sitting in their resting position, they imitate bird droppings. The antennae are only slightly combed.

The silvery scales at the middle of the wings are sometimes said to look like a small letter. Some variations may look like Chinese characters.

Larva

The caterpillars become about 12 millimeters long and are dark brown. The thorax is clearly thickened and the end of the abdomen is extended to a narrow tip.
The larvae feed on bramble (Rubus species), hawthorn (Crataegus species) and cherry (Prunus species).

Similar species
Cilix hispanica Pérez De-Gregorio, Torruella, Miret, Casas & Figueras, 2002. Spain, Southern France, Corsica, Southern Italy, Algeria
Cilix algirica Leraut, 2006. Morocco, Algeria, Portugal, presumably also in Spain
Cilix asiatica Bang-Haas, 1907. Turkey to Iran

References

External links
 UKmoths
 Lepiforum.de

Drepaninae
Moths described in 1763
Drepanid moths of Great Britain
Moths of Africa
Moths of Asia
Moths of Europe
Taxa named by Giovanni Antonio Scopoli